Eta Phi Beta (ΗΦΒ) is an  African american business sorority founded in October 1942 by 11 business majors.  Eta Phi Beta was founded in Detroit, Michigan at the historically black Lewis Business College. In 1997, the organization had 91 chapters and over 5000 members internationally.

Founders
The founders include Ivy Burt Banks, Earline Carter, Katherine Douglas, Mae Edwards Curry, Merry Green Hubbard, Ethel Madison, Ann Porter, Lena Reed, Mattie Rankin, Atheline Shelton Graham, and Dorothy Sylvers Brown. Eta Phi Beta was founded to foster women to enter into the world of business.

Organization
Eta Phi Beta has a 3-month initiation process.  Past Presidents include Louise Broadmax.   Mildred Harpole in the 1990s   Loretta Kirk-Adair served as the 16th National President from 2010-2014. In August 2014, Dr. Lillie Anderton Robinson became the 17th National President.  In  2016 Dr. Robinson was re-elected to a second term through July 2018.  Additional chapters exist at schools such as St. Augestine's.  as well as the city of Indianapolis. The organization has over 80 chapters nationwide in 2002.  Initiatives also include the Queen Bee Initiative.  An auxiliary organization of Eta Phi Beta is the National Council of Shad Clubs.

Community 
In 1977 the Michigan state  House of Representatives, a resolution making May 14, 1977 the Eta Phi Beta Sorority Day.  On June 13, 2009, That the House of Representatives of the 81st Texas Legislature hereby honor Eta Phi Beta Sorority, Inc., as it commemorates its 2009 Founders Day.   Another resolution was made in the state of Georgia. Eta Phi Beta funds various organizations including the March of Dimes, the NAACP, and the United Negro College Fund.  Eta Phi Beta is an affiliate member of the National Council of Negro Women.

See also

 List of African-American Greek and fraternal organizations
 Professional fraternities and sororities

References

Student organizations established in 1942
1942 establishments in Michigan
Fraternities and sororities in the United States
Non-profit organizations based in Michigan
African-American fraternities and sororities